Henry Rowe Schoolcraft (March 28, 1793 – December 10, 1864) was an American geographer, geologist, and ethnologist, noted for his early studies of Native American cultures, as well as for his 1832 expedition to the source of the Mississippi River. He is also noted for his major six-volume study of Native Americans commissioned by Congress and published in the 1850s.

He served as United States Indian agent in Michigan for a period beginning in 1822. During this period, he named several newly organized counties, often creating neologisms that he claimed were derived from indigenous languages.

There he married Jane Johnston, daughter of a prominent Scotch-Irish fur trader and an Ojibwe mother, who was the high-ranking daughter of Waubojeeg, a war chief. Johnston lived with her family in Sault Ste. Marie, Michigan.

Johnston was bilingual and educated, having grown up in a literate household. She taught Schoolcraft the Ojibwe language and much about her maternal culture. They had several children together, only two of whom survived past childhood. She is now recognized for her poetry and other writings as the first Native American literary writer in the United States.

Schoolcraft continued to study Native American tribes and publish works about them. In 1833, he was elected as a member of the American Philosophical Society.

By 1846 Jane had died. That year Schoolcraft was commissioned by Congress for a major study, known as Indian Tribes of the United States. It was published in six volumes from 1851 to 1857, and illustrated by Seth Eastman, a career Army officer with extensive experience as an artist of indigenous peoples.

Schoolcraft married again in 1847, to Mary Howard, from a slaveholding family in South Carolina. In 1860 she published the bestselling novel The Black Gauntlet. It was part of the Anti-Tom literature that was written in Southern response to the bestselling Uncle Tom's Cabin by Northern abolitionist Harriet Beecher Stowe.

Early life and education 
Schoolcraft was born in 1793 in Guilderland, Albany County, New York, the son of Lawrence Schoolcraft and Margaret-Anne Barbara (née Rowe) Schoolcraft. He entered Union College at age 15 and later attended Middlebury College. He was especially interested in geology and mineralogy.

His father was a glassmaker, and Schoolcraft initially studied and worked in the same industry. At age 24, he wrote his first paper on the topic, Vitreology (1817). After working in several glassworks in New York, Vermont and New Hampshire, the young Schoolcraft left the family business at age 25 to explore the western frontier.

Exploration and geologic survey
From November 18 to February 1819, Schoolcraft and his companion Levi Pettibone made an expedition from Potosi, Missouri, to what is now Springfield. They traveled further down the White River into Arkansas, making a survey of the geography, geology, and mineralogy of the area.  Schoolcraft published this study in A View of the Lead Mines of Missouri (1819). In this book he correctly identified the potential for lead deposits in the region. Missouri eventually became the number one lead-producing state. (French colonists had earlier developed a lead mine outside St. Louis in the 18th century.) He also published Journal of a Tour into the Interior of Missouri and Arkansaw (1821), the first written account of a European-American exploration of the Ozark Mountains.

This expedition and his resulting publications brought Schoolcraft to the attention of John C. Calhoun, the Secretary of War, who considered him "a man of industry, ambition, and insatiable curiosity." Calhoun recommended Schoolcraft to the Michigan Territorial Governor, Lewis Cass, for a position on an expedition led by Cass to explore the wilderness region of Lake Superior and the lands west to the upper Mississippi River. Beginning in the spring of 1820, Schoolcraft served as a geologist on the Lewis Cass expedition. Beginning in Detroit, they traveled nearly  along Lake Huron and Lake Superior, west to the Mississippi River, down the river to present-day Iowa, and then returning to Detroit after tracing the shores of Lake Michigan.

The expedition was intended to establish the source of the Mississippi River. It was also intended to settle the question of the yet undetermined boundary between the United States and British Canada. The expedition traveled as far upstream as Upper Red Cedar Lake in present-day Minnesota. Since low water precluded navigating farther upstream, the expedition designated the lake as the river's headwaters, and renamed it in honor of Cass. (Schoolcraft noted, however, that locals informed the expedition that it was possible to navigate by canoe farther upstream earlier in the year when water levels were higher.) Schoolcraft's account of the expedition was published as A Narrative Journal of Travels Through the Northwestern Regions...to the Sources of the Mississippi River (1821).

In 1821 he was a member of another government expedition, which traveled through Illinois, Indiana and Ohio. In 1832, he led a second expedition to the headwaters of the Mississippi River. Arriving a month earlier than had the 1820 expedition, he was able to take advantage of higher water to navigate to Lake Itasca.

Marriages and family
Schoolcraft met his first wife Jane Johnston soon after being assigned in 1822 to Sault Ste. Marie, Michigan, as the first US Indian agent in the region. Two years before, the government had built Fort Brady and wanted to establish an official presence to forestall any renewed British threat following the War of 1812. The government tried to ensure against British agitation of the Ojibwa.

Jane was the eldest daughter of John Johnston, a prominent Scots-Irish fur trader, and his wife Ozhaguscodaywayquay (Susan Johnston), daughter of a leading Ojibwe chief, Waubojeeg, and his wife. Both of the Johnstons were of high status; they had eight children together, and their cultured, wealthy family was well known in the area.

Jane was also known as Bamewawagezhikaquay (Woman of the Sound the Stars Make Rushing Through the Sky). Her knowledge of the Ojibwe language and culture, which she shared with Schoolcraft, formed in part the source material for Longfellow's epic poem The Song of Hiawatha.

Jane and Henry had four children together:
 William Henry (June 1824 – March 1827) died of croup at nearly three. Jane Schoolcraft wrote poems expressing her grief about his loss.
 stillborn daughter (November 1825).
 Jane Susan Ann (October 14, 1827 – November 25, 1892, Richmond, Virginia), called Janee.
 John Johnston (October 2, 1829 – April 24, 1864), served in the Civil War but was wounded at the Battle of Gettysburg and disabled. He died at the age of 34 in Elmira, New York.
 
The Schoolcrafts sent Janee and John to a boarding school in Detroit for part of their education. Janee at 11 could handle the transition, but John at nine had a more difficult time and missed his parents.

The Schoolcrafts had a literary marriage, producing a family magazine. They included their own poetry in letters to each other through the years. Jane suffered from frequent illnesses. She died in 1842, while visiting a sister in Canada, and was buried at St. John's Anglican Church, Ancaster, Ontario.

On January 12, 1847, after moving to Washington, DC, Schoolcraft married again, at age 53, to Mary Howard (died March 12, 1878). She was a southerner and slaveholder, from an elite planter family of the Beaufort district of South Carolina.  Her support of slavery and opposition to mixed-race unions created strains in her relationship with the Schoolcraft children. They became alienated from both her and their father.

After Schoolcraft's hands became paralyzed in 1848 from a rheumatic condition, Mary devoted much of her attention to caring for him and helping him complete his massive study of Native Americans, which had been commissioned by Congress in 1846.

In 1860, she published the novel The Black Gauntlet: A Tale of Plantation Life in South Carolina (which she said her husband had encouraged). One of many pro-slavery books published in response to Harriet Beecher Stowe's bestselling Uncle Tom's Cabin, such defenses of slavery, published in the decade before the American Civil War, became known as the anti-Tom genre. Hers became a best-seller, although not on the scale of Stowe's.

Indian agent

Schoolcraft began his ethnological research in 1822 during his appointment as US Indian agent at Sault Ste. Marie, Michigan.  He had responsibility for tribes in what is now northern Michigan, Wisconsin, and Minnesota.  From his wife Jane Johnston, Schoolcraft learned the Ojibwe language, as well as much of the lore of the tribe and its culture.

Schoolcraft created The Muzzeniegun, or Literary Voyager, a family magazine which he and Jane produced in the winter of 1826–1827 and circulated among friends ("muzzeniegun" being Ojibwe for book). It contained mostly his own writings, although he did include a few pieces from his wife and a few other locals. Although they produced only single issues, each was distributed widely to residents in Sault Ste. Marie, then to Schoolcraft's friends in Detroit, New York, and other eastern cities. Jane Johnston Schoolcraft used the pen names of "Rosa" and Leelinau as personae to write about different aspects of Indian culture.

Schoolcraft was elected to the legislature of the Michigan Territory, where he served from 1828 to 1832.  In 1832, he traveled again to the upper reaches of the Mississippi to settle continuing troubles between the Ojibwe and Dakota (Sioux) nations.  He worked to talk to as many Native American leaders as possible to maintain the peace. He was also provided with a surgeon and given instructions to begin vaccinating Native Americans against smallpox.  He determined that smallpox had been unknown among the Ojibwe before the return in 1750 of a war party that had contact with Europeans on the East Coast. They had gone to Montreal to assist the French against the British in the French and Indian War (the North American front of the Seven Years' War).

During the voyage, Schoolcraft took the opportunity to explore the region, making the first accurate map of the Lake District around western Lake Superior. Following the lead of Ozawindib, an Ojibwe guide, Schoolcraft encountered the true headwaters of the Mississippi River, a lake that the natives called "Omushkos", meaning Elk Lake. which Schoolcraft renamed Lake Itasca, a name which he coined from the Latin words veritas meaning 'truth' and caput meaning 'head'. The nearby Schoolcraft River, the first major tributary of the Mississippi, was later named in his honor.  United States newspapers widely covered this expedition.  Schoolcraft followed up with a personal account of the discovery with his book, Narrative of an Expedition Through the Upper Mississippi River to Itasca Lake (1834).

After his territory for Indian Affairs was greatly increased in 1833, Schoolcraft and his wife Jane moved to Mackinac Island, the new headquarters of his administration.  In 1836, he was instrumental in settling land disputes with the Ojibwe.  He worked with them to accomplish the Treaty of Washington (1836), by which they ceded to the United States a vast territory of more than 13 million acres (53,000 km2), worth many millions of dollars.  He believed that the Ojibwe would be better off learning to farm and giving up their wide hunting lands. The government agreed to pay subsidies and provide supplies while the Ojibwe made a transition to a new way of living, but its provision of the promised subsidies was often late and underfunded. The Ojibwe suffered as a result.

In 1838 pursuant to the terms of the treaty, Schoolcraft oversaw the construction of the Indian Dormitory on Mackinac Island. The building is listed on the National Register of Historic Places. It provided temporary housing to the Ojibwe who came to Mackinac Island to receive annuities during their transition to what was envisioned by the US government as a more settled way of life.

In 1839 Schoolcraft was appointed Superintendent of Indian Affairs in the Northern Department.  He began a series of Native American studies later published as the Algic Researches (2 vols., 1839).  These included his collection of Native American stories and legends, many of which his wife Jane Johnston Schoolcraft told him or translated for him from her culture.

While in Michigan, Schoolcraft became a member of the Board of Regents of the University of Michigan in its early years. In this position he helped establish the state university's financial organization.

Founding magazines
Schoolcraft founded and contributed to the first United States journal on public education, The Journal of Education.  He also published The Souvenir of the Lakes, the first literary magazine in Michigan.

Naming places
Schoolcraft named many of Michigan's counties and locations within the former Michigan Territory.  He named Leelanau County, Michigan after his wife's pen name of "Leelinau".  For those counties established in 1840, he made elisions – the process of joining or merging morphemes that contained abstract ideas from multiple languages – to form unique place names he considered as never previously used in North America. In names such as Alcona, Algoma, Allegan, Alpena, Arenac, Iosco, Kalkaska, Leelanau, Lenawee, Oscoda and Tuscola, for example, Schoolcraft combined words and syllables from Native American languages with words and syllables from Latin and Arabic. Lake Itasca, the source lake of the Mississippi River, is another example of his eliding Native American and Latin morphemes. In 1843 the unique names of six counties named in 1840 after Native Michigan chiefs were erased – Kautawaubet County, Kaykakee County,  Keskkauko County, Meegisee County, Mikenauk County and Tonedagana County. But none of the 1840 counties with unique Schoolcraft elisions were changed.

Later years

When the Whig Party came to power in 1841 with the election of William Henry Harrison, Schoolcraft lost his political position as Indian agent.  He and Jane moved to New York. She died the next year during a visit with a sister in Canada, while Schoolcraft was traveling in Europe.

He continued to write about Native Americans.  In 1846 Congress commissioned him to develop a comprehensive reference work on American Indian tribes.  Schoolcraft traveled to England to request the services of George Catlin to illustrate his proposed work, as the latter was widely regarded as the premier illustrator of Indian life. Schoolcraft was deeply disappointed when Catlin refused.  Schoolcraft later engaged the artist Seth Eastman, a career Army officer, as illustrator. An Army brigadier general, Eastman was renowned for his paintings of Native American peoples.  He had two extended assignments at Fort Snelling in present-day Minnesota, the second time as commander of the fort, and had closely studied, drawn and painted the people of the Indian cultures of the Great Plains.

Schoolcraft worked for years on the history and survey of the Indian tribes of the United States. It was published in six volumes from 1851 to 1857 by J. B. Lippincott & Co. of Philadelphia. Critics praised its scholarship and valuable content by Schoolcraft, and the meticulous and knowledgeable illustrations by Eastman.  Critics also noted the work's shortcomings, including a lack of index, and poor organization, which made the information almost inaccessible. Almost 100 years later, in 1954, the Bureau of American Ethnology of the Smithsonian Institution prepared and published an index to the volumes. (It was not until 1928 that the US government conducted another overall study of the conditions of American Indians; it was informally known as the Meriam Report, after the technical director of the team, Lewis Meriam.)

Schoolcraft died in Washington, D.C. on December 10, 1864.  After his death, Schoolcraft's second wife Mary donated over 200 books from his library, which had been published in 35 different Native American languages, to the Boston Athenæum.  Schoolcraft and Mary were each buried in the Congressional Cemetery in Washington, DC.  His papers are archived in the Library of Congress.

Works
 A View of the Lead-Mines of Missouri, including Observations on the Mineralogy and Geology of Missouri and Arkansaw (New York, 1819)
 "Transallegania, or the Groans of Missouri," a poem (1820)
 Journal of a Tour in the Interior of Missouri and Arkansas (1820)
 Travels from Detroit to the Sources of the Mississippi with an Expedition under Lewis Cass (Albany, 1821)
 Travels in the Central Portions of Mississippi Valley (New York, 1825)
 "The Rise of the West, or a Prospect of the Mississippi Valley," a poem (Detroit, 1827)
 "Indian Melodies," a poem (1830)
 The Man of Bronze (1834)
 Iosco, or the Vale of Norma (Detroit, 1834)
 Narrative of an Expedition Through the Upper Mississippi River to Itasca Lake (New York, 1834)
 "Helderbergia, or the Apotheosis of the Heroes of the Anti-Rent War," an anonymous poem (Albany, 1835)
 Algic Researches, a book of Indian allegories and legends (2 vols., 1839)
 Cyclopædia indianensis, of which only a single number was issued (1842)
 "Alhalla, or the Land of Talladega," a poem published under the pen-name "Henry Rowe Colcraft" (1843)
 Oneota, or Characteristics of the Red Race of America (1844-5) Republished as The Indian and his Wigwam (1848)
 Report on Aboriginal Names and the Geographical Terminology of New York (1845)
 Plan for Investigating American Ethnology (1846)
 Notes on the Iroquois, containing his report on the Six Nations (Albany, 1846; enlarged editions, New York, 1847 and 1848)
 The Red Race of America (1847)
 Notices of Antique Earthen Vessels from Florida (1847)
 Address on Early American History (New York, 1847)
 Outlines of the Life and Character of Gen. Lewis Cass (Albany, 1848)
 Bibliographical Catalogue of Books, Translations of the Scriptures, and other Publications in the Indian Tongues of the United States (Washington, 1849)
 American Indians, their History, Condition, and Prospects (Auburn, 1850)
 Personal Memoirs of a Residence of Thirty Years with the Indian Tribes on the American Frontiers, 1812 to 1842 (Philadelphia, 1851)
 Historical and Statistical Information respecting the History, Condition, and Prospects of the Indian Tribes of the United States, with illustrations by Capt. Seth Eastman, published by authority of congress, which appropriated nearly $30,000 a volume for the purpose (6 vols., 1851–7) He had collected material for two additional volumes, but the government suddenly suspended the publication of the work.
 Scenes and Adventures in the Semi-Alpine Region of the Ozark Mountains of Missouri and Arkansas, a revised edition of his first book of travel (1853)
 Summary Narrative of an Exploratory Expedition to the Sources of the Mississippi River in 1820, resumed and completed by the Discovery of its Origin in Itasca Lake in 1832 (1854)
 The Myth of Hiawatha, and other Oral Legends (1856).
 Mentor L. Williams, ed., Narrative Journal of travels Through the Northwestern Regions of the United States Extending from Detroit through the Great Chain of the American Lakes to the Sources of the Mississippi River in the year 1820, East Lansing, Michigan: The Michigan State College Press, 1953.
The Indian Fairy-Book, from Original Legends (New York, 1855), was compiled from notes that he furnished to the editor, Cornelius Mathews.

Memberships
Elected a member of the American Antiquarian Society in 1821.

Legacy and honors

Numerous counties, towns, lakes, streams, roads and other geographic features are named in his honor, including:
 Schoolcraft County in Michigan.
 Schoolcraft Township in Houghton County, Michigan.
 Schoolcraft Township in Kalamazoo County, Michigan.
 Schoolcraft Township in Hubbard County, Minnesota.
 The Village of Schoolcraft in Kalamazoo County, Michigan.
 Schoolcraft River and Schoolcraft Lake in Minnesota.
 Schoolcraft Island in Lake Itasca, Minnesota.
 U.S. Route 65 in the vicinity of Springfield, Missouri is named the Schoolcraft Freeway.
 Schoolcraft Roads are located in Marquette and Wayne Counties, Michigan, and in Dakota County, Minnesota.
 Schoolcraft College in Livonia, Michigan is named in his honor.
 Henry R. Schoolcraft Elementary School in Waterford, Michigan is named in his honor.
 Henry's Food Court on the Schoolcraft College campus in Livonia, Michigan is founded in his name.
 Schoolcraft State Park in Minnesota was established to commemorate his expeditions in 1820 and 1832.
 The Liberty ship SS Henry R. Schoolcraft was launched in 1943.

Citations

Further reading
 Bremer, Richard G. (1987). Indian Agent & Wilderness Scholar: The Life of Henry Rowe Schoolcraft. Clarke Historical Library, Central Michigan University. 
 Lovell, Linda. "Henry Rowe Schoolcraft (1793–1864)", The Encyclopedia of Arkansas History and Culture, Central Arkansas Library System, Accessed on January 21, 2007.
 Merrill, George P. (1924) The First One Hundred Years of American Geology. Reprinted by Hafner Publishing Co., 1969.
 Mumford, Jeremy. "Mixed-race identity in a nineteenth-century family: the Schoolcrafts of Sault Ste. Marie, 1824–27", Michigan Historical Review, Mar 22, 1999, accessed Dec 11, 2008
 Osborn,  Chase S. and Stellanova Osborn. Schoolcraft-Longfellow-Hiawatha (1942) online
 Savage, Henry Jr. (1979) Discovering America 1700–1875. Harper & Row, pp. 229–233.
Tanner, Helen Hornbeck. "Schoolcraft, Henry Rowe" American National Biography online
 Toomey, Mary J.  "Schoolcraft College — The Name and its Significance" , Schoolcraft College, Accessed on February 13, 2007.

External links 

 
 
 
 Henry Rowe Schoolcraft, The Online Books Page, University of Pennsylvania
 Boston Athenæum: Schoolcraft Collection of Books in Native American Languages. Digital Collection.
 Henry Rowe Schoolcraft, Journal of 1818–1819 Tour of the Ozarks, Missouri State University

1793 births
1864 deaths
People from Guilderland, New York
American anthropologists
American geographers
American geologists
Michigan Territory officials
Pre-statehood history of Minnesota
Pre-statehood history of Michigan
Writers from Michigan
Writers from New York (state)
People from Washington County, Missouri
People from Beaufort County, South Carolina
Members of the Michigan Territorial Legislature
Regents of the University of Michigan
Union College (New York) alumni
Middlebury College alumni
United States Indian agents
People from Sault Ste. Marie, Michigan
American male writers
Michigan Democrats
Members of the American Antiquarian Society
19th-century American politicians
Neologists